The 1951–52 NBA season was the Bullets' 5th season in the NBA.

Draft picks

Roster
{| class="toccolours" style="font-size: 95%; width: 100%;"|}
|-
! colspan="2" style="background-color: #00519a;  color: #FFFFFF; text-align: center;" | Baltimore Bullets 1952–53 roster
|- style="background-color: #FFFFFF; color: #00519a;   text-align: center;"
|-
| valign="top" |
{| class="sortable" style="background:transparent; margin:0px; width:100%;"|}
! Pos. !! # !! Nat. !! Name !! Ht. !! Wt. !! From
|-

Regular season

Season standings

Record vs. opponents

Game log

Player statistics

References

Baltimore Bullets (1944–1954) seasons
Baltimore